Ljuša is a small village located partly in the town of Šipovo in Republika Srpska and partly in the municipality of Donji Vakuf, Bosnia and Herzegovina.

Demographics 
According to the 2013 census, its population was 14, all Serbs in the Šipovo part with none living in the Donji Vakuf part.

Notable residents
 Mitrofan Kodić

References

External links
 Šipovo official website 

Populated places in Donji Vakuf
Populated places in Šipovo